Ernest DeWitt Burton (February 4, 1856 – May 26, 1925) was an American biblical scholar and president of the University of Chicago.

Biography

Burton was born in Granville, Ohio and graduated from Denison University in 1876. After graduating from Rochester Theological Seminary in 1882, he studied in Germany at Leipzig and Berlin, then taught at seminaries in Rochester and Newton (1882–1892). Burton was then appointed chief of the department of New Testament literature and interpretation at the University of Chicago and in 1897 was named editor of the American Journal of Theology. Burton was president of the Chicago Society of Biblical Research in 1906–1907. He served as the third president of the University of Chicago from 1923 until his death from cancer in 1925.

Publications

Burton notably wrote with Shailer Mathews, Constructive Studies in the Life of Christ (1901) and Principles and Ideals of the Sunday School (1903), and with J. M. P. Smith and G. B. Smith he wrote Biblical Ideas of Atonement (1909).

Works
 
  
 
 
  - Originally published under the title Constructive Studies in the Life of Christ
   
 
  
 
 
 
 
 
 
  - contains "The published writings of Ernest De Witt Burton": pages 153-159

References

External links

Guide to the University of Chicago Office of the President, Harper, Judson and Burton Administrations Records 1869-1925 at the University of Chicago Special Collections Research Center

1856 births
1925 deaths
Academic journal editors
American biblical scholars
American theologians
Colgate Rochester Crozer Divinity School alumni
Critics of the Christ myth theory
Denison University alumni
New Testament scholars
People from Granville, Ohio
Presidents of the University of Chicago
University of Chicago faculty